674 Squadron AAC is a unit of the British Army Air Corps. It conducts flying grading for potential army pilots as a part of the army flying training selection process. Pre-selected candidates are introduced to the flying training environment on a syllabus which includes basic flying exercises. Candidates' suitability for further training is assessed and graded and this information is used as a part of the overall selection criteria.

History

Formation
The number 674 was one of several allocated to the RAF AOP Squadrons during the second world war, however no squadron was commissioned before the numbers were transferred to the Army Air Corps in 1957. The number remained unused until the emergence of a distinct army and navy presence at the Defence Elementary Flying Training School necessitated restructuring into two separate squadrons. 674 Squadron was selected because it was the next available unused number.

A formation parade and ceremony was held at RAF Barkston Heath on 11 July 2003, with the Squadron stood up under the first Officer Commanding, Major A M Mills AAC. The squadron was inaugurated by Major General Richard Gerrard-Wright CB CBE DL on behalf of the Chief of the Defence Staff, General Sir Mike Walker. The Chief of the Defence Staff granted the squadron its own march, 'The Lincolnshire Poacher'.

Recent operations

Until April 2021 674 Sqn AAC was based at RAF Barkston Heath in Lincolnshire and latterly conducted Elementary Flying Training, operating the Slingsby Firefly in the 1990s through to around 2007, the Grob 115 Tutor from around 2007 until acquisition of the Prefect T1 turboprop trainer in the late 2010s. Students from all three Services of the Armed Forces were trained during this time as well as a limited number of students from overseas, mainly from certain Gulf States. Training was delivered as part of the UK Military Flying Training System (UKMFTS) contract.
The Squadron was temporarily stood down in April 2021 before reforming at Middle Wallop and a transition to the flying grading role.

Heraldry
The squadron motto 'Nothing Is Impossible' was selected by the Regimental Committee of the Army Air Corps in order to perpetuate the memory of the Glider Pilot Regiment which bore the same motto.

The squadron crest bears the Sphinx of the Royal Lincolnshire Regiment, chosen because of the squadron's initial location at Barkston Heath in Lincolnshire and the close association of the Chief of the Defence Staff with the Army Air Corps (he was the Regimental Colonel) and the Royal Anglian Regiment, the successor to the Royal Lincolnshire Regiment.

See also
 703 Naval Air Squadron - the equivalent Royal Navy squadron, also based at RAF Barkston Heath.
 List of Army Air Corps aircraft units

References

Army Air Corps aircraft squadrons
Education in Lincolnshire
Military units and formations established in 2003
Military units and formations established in 2021
Military units and formations disestablished in 2021
South Kesteven District